Taoyuan Subdistrict may refer to the following locations in the People's Republic of China:

Written as "桃园街道":
 Taoyuan Subdistrict, Zhuozhou, Hebei
 Taoyuan Subdistrict, Xuzhou, in Quanshan District, Xuzhou, Jiangsu
 Taoyuan Subdistrict, Tonghua, in Dongchang District, Tonghua, Jilin
 Taoyuan Subdistrict, Tongchuan, in Wangyi District, Tongchuan, Shaanxi
 Taoyuan Subdistrict, Pingyuan County, Shandong
 Taoyuan Subdistrict, Rongcheng, Shandong
 Taoyuan Subdistrict, Gujiao, Shanxi
 Taoyuan Subdistrict, Tianjin

Written as "桃源街道":
 Taoyuan Subdistrict, Shenzhen, in Nanshan District, Shenzhen, Guangdong
 Taoyuan Subdistrict, Nanchang, in Xihu District, Nanchang, Jiangxi
 Taoyuan Subdistrict, Changchun, in Nanguan District, Changchun, Jilin
 Taoyuan Subdistrict, Dalian, in Zhongshan District, Dalian, Liaoning
 Taoyuan Subdistrict, Ninghai County, Zhejiang